Vladimir (Cantarean), (born Nicolae Cantarean on 18 August 1952), is a bishop of the Moldovan Orthodox Church under the Moscow Patriarchate. He serves as Metropolitan of Chişinău and All Moldova and thus as first hierarch of the Church of Moldova and as a permanent member of the Holy Synod of the Russian Orthodox Church.

Life
Nicolae Cantarean was born in Kolinkivtsi, Khotyn Raion, in the west of the Ukrainian SSR, part of the historical region of Bessarabia, nowadays bordering northern Moldova. Born into a working-class family, in 1969 Nicolae graduated from secondary school and, in 1970, from vocational school. He served in the Soviet Army from 1970 until 1973, after which he began working in the administration of the Eparchy of Smolensk.

On May 22, 1974, Nicolae was ordained as a celibate deacon, and then on May 22, 1976, as a celibate priest in Smolensk's Cathedral of the Dormition. In 1981 Hieromonk Nicolae graduated from the Moscow Theological Seminary and was appointed to serve at the Cathedral of St. Nicholas in Chernivtsi the same year. From 1983 Fr. Nicolae also served as secretary of the administration of the Eparchy of Chernivtsi and Bukovina.

On November 29, 1987, Fr. Nicolae was tonsured a monk with the name of Vladimir, and in 1988 was elevated to the rank of archimandrite. In 1989 Archimandrite Vladimir graduated from the Moscow Theological Academy, and on July 21, 1989, was consecrated Bishop of Chişinău and Moldova at Holy Theophany Cathedral in Moscow. On April 4, 1990, Bishop Vladimir was elevated to the rank of archbishop, and on December 21, 1992, to the rank of metropolitan as head of the newly autonomous Moldovan Orthodox Church. Along with Vincent (Morar), he was a strong opponent of the reactivation of the Metropolis of Bessarabia (under the leadership of Petru (Păduraru)) within the Romanian Orthodox Church, even persecuting some of its believers.

At the Russian Orthodox Council of Bishops in August 2000 Metropolitan Vladimir was elected a permanent member of the Russian Orthodox Holy Synod.

References

Sources
Vladimir, Metropolitan of Chişinău and All Moldova (Russian)

External links
Metropolitan Vladimir (Moldovan/Romanian)
Vladimir, Metropolitan of Chisinau and All Moldova (Russian)

1952 births
Ukrainian Orthodox bishops
Eastern Orthodox monks
Living people
Bishops of the Moldovan Orthodox Church
People from Chernivtsi Oblast